The New York University Steinhardt School of Culture, Education, and Human Development (commonly referred to as Steinhardt) is the secondary liberal arts and education school of New York University. It is one of the only schools in the world of its type.

Founded in 1890, it is the first school of pedagogy to be established at an American university. Prior to 2001, it was known as the NYU School of Education.

Located on NYU's founding campus in Greenwich Village, the Steinhardt School offers bachelor's, master's, advanced certificate, and doctoral programs in the fields of applied psychology, art, education, health, media, and music. NYU Steinhardt also offers several degree programs at NYU's Brooklyn campus.

History 

Founded in 1890 as the School of Pedagogy, the School soon added courses in psychology, counseling, art, and music. In 1910, it established the first US university chair in experimental education. During the 1920s, enrollment increased from 990 to more than 9,500 students. The Education Building on Washington Square opened in 1930 and still serves as the School's home today.

The School was named the Steinhardt School of Education in 2001, in recognition of a $10 million donation, the largest it has ever received, from Michael and Judy Steinhardt. In 2007, the school was renamed the Steinhardt School of Culture, Education, and Human Development to reflect the diversity of its academic programs.

Academics 

NYU Steinhardt enrolls roughly 5950 students from 67 countries, consisting of approximately 2540 undergraduates, 2820 master's and advanced certificate students, 390 PhD students, and 140 professional doctorate students.  Nearly one-third are people of color and 16% are international students. Its graduate school is NYU's largest.

In 2013–14, Steinhardt granted 705 undergraduate degrees, 1551 master's degrees, and 154 doctoral degrees. There are more than 75,000 active Steinhardt alumni.

The school employs 290 full-time faculty in 11 academic departments:

Department of Administration, Leadership, and Technology
Master's, doctoral, and advanced certificate programs are offered in Educational Leadership, Educational Communication and Technology, Higher and Postsecondary Education, and Business and Workplace Education.

Department of Applied Psychology
Programs include an undergraduate degree in Applied Psychology; master's degrees in Counseling and Guidance, Counseling for Mental Health and Wellness, online Master's in Counseling (Counseling@NYU), online Master's in Mental Health Counseling, Online Master's in School Counseling, and Human Development and Social Intervention; and doctoral degrees in Counseling Psychology, Psychological Development, Online Doctorate in Occupational Therapy and Psychology and Social Intervention.

Department of Communicative Sciences and Disorders
With programs for undergraduate, master's and doctoral studies. The department offers an online master's in speech language pathology.

Department of Humanities and Social Sciences in the Professions
Academic programs include Sociology of Education, History of Education, Education and Social Policy, International Education, Education and Jewish Studies, Education Studies, and Applied Statistics in Social Science Research.

Department of Media, Culture, and Communication 
The Department of Media, Culture, and Communication at NYU Steinhardt offers undergraduate, master's, and doctoral programs.

Department of Music and Performing Arts Professions

Established in 1925, Steinhardt's Department of Music and Performing Arts Professions is home to nearly all of NYU's music performance degree programs. Nearly 1600 students are enrolled in undergraduate, master's and doctoral studies in music technology, music business, music composition, film scoring, music performance practices, performing arts therapies, and performing arts education (in music, dance, and drama). Programs integrate performance, research, technology, and practice.

Department of Nutrition, Food Studies, and Public Health
Undergraduate, master's, and doctoral degree programs in Nutrition and Dietetics, Food Studies, and Global Public Health.

Department of Occupational Therapy
Degree programs in occupational therapy include an entry-level professional Master of Science, a post-professional Master of Arts, a doctor of philosophy, and a doctor of professional studies.

Department of Physical Therapy
For practicing physical therapists, the department offers advanced degrees for post-professional education and training. Academic programs include a doctor of physical therapy, a master of arts with a concentration in pathokinesiology, a research in physical therapy PhD, and a clinical residency program in orthopedic physical therapy.

Department of Teaching and Learning
Undergraduate, graduate, and doctoral programs are available in areas of study such as childhood, literacy, environmental, science, and bilingual education, with initial and professional certification options.

Research Centers and Institutes 
NYU Steinhardt receives research funding exceeding $30 million annually, and its 16 research centers and institutes impact scholarship and policies around the globe.

Center for Health, Identity, Behavior, and Prevention Studies (CHIBPS)
A leading HIV, substance abuse, and mental health behavior research center focused on the well-being of all people, including sexual, racial, ethnic, and cultural minorities and other marginalized populations, CHIBPS envisions, develops, and enacts research with and for the communities it studies. It trains the future generation of behavioral and public health researchers and works with community partners to conduct research that resides on the hyphen between theory and practice.

Center for the Promotion of Research Involving Innovative Statistical Methodology (PRIISM)
It collaborates on research projects, trains graduate students, directs discussion groups, and leads a Methods and Seminar Series and a biannual Statistics in Society lecture.

Center for Research on Culture, Development, and Education (CHREO) 
Its faculty, research staff, and graduate students specialize in survey design, data collection, and reporting, using methodological approaches to inform complex educational issues and examine student learning.

Child and Family Policy Center
Faculty and researchers affiliated with the Center conduct research, technical assistance, and research dissemination activities.

Consortium for Research and Evaluation of Advanced Technology (CREATE)
CREATE engages in research on the design, critique, and evaluation of advanced digital technologies for learning. Projects involve interdisciplinary teams of scholars and developers who bridge basic and applied research, development, and evaluation. CREATE fosters collaboration among scholars within NYU and partnering institutions, nationally and internationally, and provides a range of research opportunities for students at NYU.

Institute for Education and Social Policy (IESP)
Founded in 1995 as a partnership between Steinhardt and the NYU Wagner School of Public Service, IESP conducts non-partisan scientific research about US education and related social issues.

Institute of Human Development and Social Change (IHDSC)
The largest interdisciplinary research center on NYU's Washington Square campus, IHDSC supports more than 40 faculty affiliates from the social, behavioral, and health sciences in studying how social forces such as globalization, technology, and immigration affect human development.

The Metropolitan Center for Research on Equity and Transformation of Schools (Metro Center)
The center is directed by Dr. David Kirkland. Its programs serve more than 5,000 classroom staff impacting 125,000 students.

The Reading Recovery Program Northeast Regional Site 
Reading Recovery is a short-term early literacy intervention designed to accelerate progress and lift achievement levels for the low-performing first-grade students. Students receive 30 minutes of daily, one-on-one instruction from a trained Reading Recovery teacher for 12 to 20 weeks. NYU Steinhardt is the primary teacher leader training site for Reading Recovery in NY and NJ. Since 1999, NYU has served approximately 119,000 children through the program.

The Research Alliance for New York City Schools 
The Research Alliance conducts rigorous studies on topics that matter to New York City's public schools. It maintains a unique archive of longitudinal data on city schools and communities and advances educational equity by providing non-partisan evidence about policies and practices that promote student development and academic success.

The Steinhardt Institute for Higher Education Policy
The Steinhardt Institute for Higher Education Policy defines and assesses challenges facing colleges and universities.

Wallerstein Collaborative for Urban Environmental Education

The Wallerstein Collaborative works with K-12 educators, graduate students, and college faculty. The Collaborative conducts year-round programs for public school teachers to incorporate environmental education opportunities in their classrooms.

Online programs 
Steinhardt offers both master's and doctorate degrees online. Fields of study include education, counseling, occupational therapy, and communicative sciences and disorders.

Online Master’s in Mental Health Counseling Program 
The Master of Arts in Counseling for Mental Health and Wellness program is accredited through the Masters in Psychology and Counseling Accreditation Council (MPCAC). The program requires 60 credits, 1 lab, 100 hours of practicum experience and 600 internship hours. Students may start the program at three dates throughout the year and can complete the program in 21 months. Coursework includes Abnormal Psychology, Cross-Cultural Counseling, Human Growth and Development, and Research and Evaluation in Behavioral Sciences.

Online Master’s in School Counseling Program 
NYU Steinhardt's Master of Arts in Counseling and Guidance program is accredited by the Masters in Psychology and Counseling Accreditation Council (MPCAC). The program offers two concentrations: school counseling and bilingual school counseling. Students can complete the degree in as few as 18 months, and must complete 100 practicum hours and 600 internship hours. Students explore topics such as individual counseling, group dynamics, cross-cultural counseling, program development and evaluation, and counseling theory and process.

Online Master’s in Speech Language Pathology Program 
The online program, Speech@NYU, is accredited by the American Speech-Language-Hearing Association's (ASHA) Council on Academic Accreditation (CAA). Speech@NYU is the online counterpart to NYU's on-campus graduate SLP program, which has been continuously accredited by ASHA for more than 30 years. Both of these ASHA-accredited graduate programs are also accredited by the New York Office of the Professions. During the program, students must complete five clinical practicum and field placement experiences in at least three different settings. These placements allow students to work with children and adults in individual and group settings.

Deans 
 Jerome Allen (1890–1894)
 Edward R. Shaw (1890–1901)
 Thomas M. Balliet (1904–1921)
 John W. Withers (1921–1939)
 Enoch George Payne (1939–1945)
 Ernest O. Melby (1945–1956)
 George D. Stoddard (1956–1960)
 Walter A. Anderson (1960–1964)
 Daniel E. Griffiths (1965–1983)
 Robert A. Burnham (1983–1989)
 Ann Marcus (1989–2003)
 Mary Brabeck (2003–2014)
 Dominic Brewer (2014–2019)
 Jack H. Knott (2020–present)

Notable alumni 

 Rachel Griffin Accurso, YouTuber and educator known online as Ms. Rachel
 Sal Albanese (born 1949), politician
 Marv Albert, sportscaster
 Blake Allen, composer and musician
 Ludmilla Azova, operatic soprano (as New York College of Music)
 Gloria Allred (born 1941), civil rights lawyer
 Ian Axel of A Great Big World, singers and songwriters
 Wilfred Conwell Bain,  music educator and university administrator known for revitalizing to national both the University of North Texas College of Music as dean from 1938 to 1947 and the Jacobs School of Music as dean from 1947 to 1973 (as New York College of Music)
 Joy Bauer (born 1963), nutritionist
 Romare Bearden, artist 
 Ib Benoh, artist
 Rose Levy Beranbaum, nutritionist, author
 Elmer Bernstein (1922-2004), film composer (as New York College of Music)
 Alessandra Biaggi (born 1986), New York State Senator
 Ross Bleckner, artist
 Judy Blume (born 1938), author
 Carol Bove (born 1971), artist
 Rustica Carpio, actress, writer, and scholar
 Victoria Clark, director and Tony Award-winning actress known for musical theatre
 Cy Coleman (1929-2004), composer (as New York College of Music)
 Betty Comden, lyricist, playwright, actress
 C. C. DeVille (born 1962), guitarist
 Stefanie DeLeo, author and playwright 
 Eric Dever, fine artist, painter 
 Barbaralee Diamonstein-Spielvogel, writer and chair, New York City Landmarks Preservation Commission
 Katrina Rose Dideriksen, actress and singer known for touring with Hairspray and for competing on The Voice
 Monica Dogra, actress and musician
 Mary Beth Edelson, artist
 Claire Fagin, nurse, academic, educator
 Vernice Ferguson, nurse, medical director
 Jack Fina, bandleader, songwriter, and pianist (as New York College of Music)
 William Gaines, founder and publisher, Mad Magazine
 Ann Grifalconi, author, illustrator 
 Jerry Gonzalez, jazz trumpeter and percussionist (as New York College of Music)
 Happy Hairston, professional basketball player
 Dorothy Height, social activist
 Teresa Patterson Hughes, California State Senator
 Arielle Jacobs, singer and actress of musical theatre
 Robert Jarvik, developer of the artificial heart
 Jay Armstrong Johnson, actor, singer, and dancer known for Broadway musical theatre
 Susan Kare, graphic designer
 Lucy Kelston, operatic soprano (as New York College of Music)
 Jerome Kern, composer of musical theatre and popular music known for classics as "Ol' Man River" (as New York College of Music)
 Kevin Kern, Broadway actor
 Burt Lancaster (1913-1994), actor (did not graduate)
 Lauv, singer, songwriter, and record producer
 Tania Leon, conductor, composer 
 Enoch Light, music technologist, composer
 Sheila Lukins, chef, food writer
 Annie B. Martin, labor and civil rights activist
 Barry Manilow, pop singer and songwriter (as New York College of Music)
 Inonge Mbikusita-Lewanika, ambassador of the Republic of Zambia to the US
 Frank McCourt (1930-2009), author
 Miles McMillan, artist
 Alan Menken, Academy Award and Oscar-winning composer and pianist
 Ruthie Ann Miles, Tony Award-winning actress known for roles in musical theatre and television
 Marvin Miller, executive director, Major League Baseball Players Association
 Velmanette Montgomery, politician
 Bruce Morrow, radio host
 Ildaura Murillo-Rohde, nurse, academic, UN representative to UNICEF
 Jules Olitski (1922-2007), artist
 Pearl Primus, dancer and choreographer
 Joya Powell, dancer, Bessie Award winning choreographer, and educator
 Joseph Reagle, Wikipedia scholar
 Cornelius L. Reid, author and vocal pedagogue specializing in the bel canto technique (as New York College of Music)
 Ian Riccaboni, sports broadcaster, host of Ring of Honor
 Will Roland, actor
 Charlotte Ronson, fashion designer
 Hafiz Sahar, Editor-in-Chief of national newspaper in Afghanistan (1970s), Fulbright Scholar
 Martin Scorsese, multi award-winning filmmaker
 Matthew Sklar, composer for musical theatre, television, and film
 John Patrick Shanley, Oscar-winning screenwriter, playwright, and director 
 Elena Shaddow, Broadway and Off-Broadway actress and singer
 Joel Shapiro, sculptor
 Wayne Shorter, jazz musician and composer (as New York College of Music)
 Tillotama Shome, award-winning Indian film actress
 Marilyn Singer (born 1948), author
 Alan Silva, jazz double bassist and keyboardist (as New York College of Music)
 Ferdinand Sorenson, music educator, conductor, composer, dance instructor, performer
 Robert Smigel, actor, voice actor, comedian, humorist, writer, director, producer, and puppeteer
 Olivia Smith (journalist), Emmy award-winning journalist
 Meng Tang, media artist
 Harriet Taub, executive director, Materials for the Arts
 Cecil Taylor, classically trained pianist and pioneer of free jazz (as New York College of Music)
 LeRoy T. Walker, president of US Olympic Committee 
 Harvey Weisenberg (born 1933), politician
 Austin Wintory, composer for video games and film
 Michael Zimmer, privacy and social media scholar

Notable faculty 

Steinhardt's notable faculty have included:

 Mark Adamo, composer and librettist known for his opera Little Women.
 Arjun Appadurai, anthropologist, globalization theorist, media scholar, Goddard Professor of Media, Culture, and Communication
 Richard Arum, sociologist of education
 Amy Bentley,  food studies professor
 Roscoe Brown, education professor, one of the Tuskegee Airmen
 Meg Bussert, actress, singer, music theatre professor
 Alexander Gemignani, Broadway actor, tenor, musician, and conductor.
 Ed Goodgold, music industry executive, writer, known for coining the term "trivia"
 Eduardus Halim, pianist, professor, inaugural holder of the Sascha Gorodnitzki Chair in Piano Studies at NYU
 Martha Hill, dance instructor and director of NYU's Dance Education program
 James Weldon Johnson, author, civil rights activist, educator, lawyer, songwriter, diplomat
 Charlton McIlwain, author, civil rights activist
 Marion Nestle, Paulette Goddard Professor of Nutrition and Food Studies, author, blogger
 Jeanne L. Noble, educator, government administrator, author, television producer
 Neil Postman, education reformer, humanist, social visionary, author, media critic, and creator of the NYU's Department of Media Ecology
 Diane Ravitch, historian of education, educational policy analyst, research professor, and former U.S. Assistant Secretary of Education
 Louise Rosenblatt, author of Literature as Exploration, noted scholar on the teaching of literature, and director of NYU's doctoral program in English Education
 John Scofield, jazz-rock guitarist and composer
 Jacob Weinberg, pianist and composer
 Hale Woodruff, printmaker, muralist, draftsman, painter

References

External links 
 

New York University schools
Music schools in New York City
Educational institutions established in 1890
Schools of education in New York (state)
1890 establishments in New York (state)